People Not as Bad as They Seem is a 1977 Finnish historical film directed by Rauni Mollberg, based on the novels by Aapeli.

The film premiered on 7 October 1977 in Finland and Sweden on 17 March 1978. It was screened in the Un Certain Regard section of the 1978 Cannes Film Festival. The film was re-released again in 2003 and premiered in the Czech Republic on 27 January 2003.

Plot
The film is about a boy and the relationship between his birth mother and step mother.

Cast

 Olavi Ahonen:  Health inspector Hyttinen
 Lauri Arajuuri:  Sulo Riippa
 Ossi Aronen: Pietari Jormalainen
 Asser Fagerström: Pianist
 Mika Hämäläinen: Viljami Pirhola
 Esko Hannula: Rusko, blacksmith
 Helge Herala: Captain
 Vihtori Hokka: Old civil guard
 Kalle Hollo: Primus Koljonen, coachman
 Esko Hukkanen.... Bailiff
 Kauko Hynninen: Chief of staff
 Kurt Ingvall: Lieutenant general
 Voitto Jokela: Violinist
 Irma Junnilainen: Klory of Vettenrantska
 Vappu Jurkka: Mrs. Rusko
 Martti Kainulainen: Harakka, janitor
 Einari Ketola: Jordan Kastikainen
 Marja Korhonen: Rakel Riippa
 Lilga Kovanko: Foreign dancer
 Paavo Laakso: Kusti
 Mikko Lecklin: Younger constable
 Hannes Lukinmaa: Vennu Harakka
 Kalle Luotonen: Pyökki, poet
 Toivo Mäkelä: Hurme, photographer
 Sirkka Metsäsaari: Vettenrantska
 Roni Mikkonen: Hati
 Mikko Nousiainen
 Salme Paasilinna: Clockmaker's wife
 Paavo Pajula: Kuikka, janitor
 Yrjö Paulo: Vähälä
 Eila Pehkonen: Mrs. Harakka
 Ossi Peura: Singer
 Risto Salmi: Jormalainen
 Veikko Salmi: Clockmaker
 Asko Sarkola: Palkeinen
 Irma Seikkula: Mrs. Valma Hurme
 Petri Skinnari: Henry
 Maija-Leena Soinne: Helga, waitress
 Mikko Tanhuanpää: Ferryman
 Toivo Tuomainen: Takkunen (as Topi Tuomainen)
 Matti Tuominen: Kekäläinen
 Rauha Valkonen: Ida Pirhola
 Raili Veivo: Karoliina
 Gustav Wiklund: Police chief

References

External links
 

1970s Finnish-language films
Finnish historical films
1977 films
Films directed by Rauni Mollberg
1970s historical films